The Lincoln MK9 is a concept car presented by Lincoln in 2001 featuring a waterfall grille with a central Lincoln emblem; two full-length chrome accents on the vehicle's left and right shoulder and chrome accented air vents near the doors on the front fenders. The interior featured lacquered wood and leather, dark cherry flooring, white leather headliner and red leather seats.

The MK9 introduced a new naming convention for Lincoln, using letter and number combinations. The naming system is similar to that of Mercedes-Benz or BMW, without referencing a vehicle's engine size.

Lincoln Mark X

The 2004 concept Lincoln Mark X (pronounced Mark 10) was Lincoln's adaptation of the 2004 Ford Thunderbird body and chassis, with a retractable hard top replacing the Thunderbird's fabric top and one-piece removable hard top.  Sharing some of its design elements with the MK9, the Mark X introduced an egg-crate chrome grille that recalled the grille of the 1964 Lincoln Continental and foreshadowed the grilles of forthcoming Lincoln vehicles.

The Mark X concept model features a convertible panoramic glass roof. The interior was also based on a "Lincolnized" version of that in the standard Thunderbird (which itself is derived from the Lincoln LS) - which differentiates it from the MK9 interior. The Mark X's official press release described the interior as "dressed in Lime Sorbet with white Corian accents, polished aluminum, dark chrome, natural grain leather seating surfaces, plush sheepskin flooring and tailored tone-on-tone stitching throughout. Its four-spoke, power-adjustable steering wheel also is leather wrapped."

External links
Lincoln Mark X official Ford media press release
IGN website summary of Mark X
Ford Concept Vehicles - Previous Auto Show Photographs (2003-2006)

MK9